Ahmed Jamal (born 23 January 2000) is an Egyptian footballer who plays for Hatta as a defender.

Career statistics

Club

Notes

References

External links
Ahmed Jamal profile at UAEFA

2000 births
Living people
Egyptian footballers
Egyptian expatriate footballers
Association football defenders
Al Ain FC players
Hatta Club players
UAE Pro League players
UAE First Division League players
Egyptian expatriate sportspeople in the United Arab Emirates
Expatriate footballers in the United Arab Emirates